The television series The English Briefcase was an produced in the year 2000. It was one of the most popular series of its time. It was directed by Ziaeddin Dorri.

Plot
The story dates back to 70 years ago, and is about a man called Dr Mansour Adiban who went back from France to Iran after his studies finished, and runs a weekly called "Free Iran" (Iran-e Azad). He took part in senate's election but there was no chance for him due to corruption. The second time, he enjoys the support of a girl from a rich and well-connected family, called Mastaneh who loves Iran and wants it to be free, too. Despite the fact that Mansoor is married, Mastaneh is in love with him, but he's too busy with politics to notice that.

References

External links
 The Theme Music (Persian)

Iranian television series
2000s Iranian television series
2000 Iranian television series debuts
Islamic Republic of Iran Broadcasting original programming